The 1967 Philadelphia Eagles season was the franchise's 35th season in the National Football League.

Offseason 
The Eagles held their 1967 training camp for the last time at Hershey Park Stadium in Hershey, Pennsylvania. The following year they trained at Albright College in Reading, Pennsylvania, home of the Albright College Lions.

NFL Draft 
The 1967 NFL Draft and the 1967 AFL Draft was a Common Draft of college players, held on March 14–15.

Player selections 
The table shows the Eagles selections and what picks they had that were traded away and the team that ended up with that pick. It is possible the Eagles' pick ended up with this team via another team that the Eagles made a trade with.
Not shown are acquired picks that the Eagles traded away.

Roster

Regular season

Schedule

Game summaries

Week 11 at Giants

Week 14

Standings

References

External links 
 Eagles on Pro Football Reference

Philadelphia Eagles seasons
Philadelphia Eagles
Philadel